Kolamsar (also Romanized as Kolāmsar and Kolām Sar; also known as Kalām Sarā, Kālehsān, and Keliser) is a village in Khara Rud Rural District, in the Central District of Siahkal County, Gilan Province, Iran. At the 2006 census, its population was 436, in 132 families.

References 

Populated places in Siahkal County